The Israel Policy Forum is an American Jewish organization that works for a negotiated two-state solution to the Israeli–Palestinian conflict though advocacy, education and policy research. The organization appeals to American policymakers in support of this goal and writes opinion pieces that have appeared in many Jewish and non-Jewish newspapers. The organization was founded in 1993.

Israel Policy Forum is chaired by Susie Gelman and its Executive Director is David Halperin.

Mission
The stated mission of Israel Policy Forum is to shape the discourse and mobilize support among American Jewish leaders and U.S. policymakers for the realization of a viable two-state solution. Israel Policy Forum believes that a two-state solution to the conflict will "safeguard Israel’s security and future as a Jewish and democratic state."

History 
Throughout its history, Israel Policy Forum has mobilized prominent Jewish leaders and American policymakers in support of pragmatic approaches to advancing Israel's security alongside the pursuit of a lasting, negotiated two-state solution to the Israeli–Palestinian conflict.

The concept for Israel Policy Forum emerged out of conversations among Robert K. Lifton, Prime Minister Yitzhak Rabin and his administration. They were interested in developing US Jewish backing for Rabin’s vision of resolving the Israel-Palestinian conflict. The organization was formed in March 1993 with the purpose of building support for the peace efforts among Jewish communal leaders.

Israel Policy Forum's first public activity was an op-ed in the New York Times on September 13, 1993, which supported the signing of the Oslo Accords. The op-ed was published on the same day that Israeli Prime Minister Yitzhak Rabin and PLO chair Yasser Arafat signed the agreement at a White House. 

During the Clinton Administration, Israel Policy Forum served as a base of influential American Jewish support for the Israeli–Palestinian peace process. President Clinton outlined his template for a Permanent Status Agreement used to resolve the Israeli-Palestinian conflict at an Israel Policy Forum’s Annual Gala in 2001. He subsequently proposed these guidelines, which came to be known as the  "Clinton Parameters,” to the Israeli and Palestinian negotiating teams.

In 2005, Israel Policy Forum mobilized 27 major Jewish organizations, including the Anti-Defamation League, American Jewish Committee, American Jewish Congress, B’nai B’rith, Hadassah, the Jewish Council for Public Affairs, and both the Reform and Conservative movements to sign on to a New York Times ad supporting disengagement from Gaza as a step toward two states. They managed this at a time when the Conference of Presidents was reluctant to do so. In the wake of the violence of the Second Intifada, Israel Policy Forum garnered broad support for the Gaza disengagement plan as a step toward renewed Israeli–Palestinian negotiations and hosted Vice Prime Minister Ehud Olmert for a landmark speech that signaled his forthcoming political transformation. Israel Policy Forum subsequently delivered policy recommendations endorsed by top diplomats to Secretary of State Condoleezza Rice in support of the Arab Peace Initiative and the Annapolis international peace conference.

In 2016, Israel Policy Forum launched a study titled Two-State Security, a project that seeks to engage students, academics, activists, community leaders, and policymakers in a dialogue on how to effectively address Israel’s security needs in the pursuit of a two-state solution in the near and long-term. For this project, Israel Policy Forum also partnered with Center for a New American Security, and Commanders for Israeli Security. In June 2016 at the Herzliya Conference, Prime Minister Ehud Barak endorsed the “Security First” plan. 

In 2017, Israel Policy Forum founded IPF Atid, millennial-led community to facilitate new connections, conversations, and campaigns surrounding issues in Israeli-Palestinian affairs. Since its founding, IPF Atid has grown substantially with six different chapters around the United States, including New York, Washington D.C., Chicago, Los Angeles, San Francisco, and Boston. IPF Atid has also led delegations of young professionals to the region to explore these topics, and has hosted various programs nation-wide and internationally. In 2019, IPF Atid founded their Women, Peace,& Security Channel,  to advance women’s involvement, expertise, and leadership in Israeli-Palestinian peace-building and Jewish communal affairs. 

In 2018, a CNAS study was released Ending Gaza’s Perpetual Crisis. Executive Director David A. Halperin, Policy Director Michael Koplow, and Chairwoman Susie Gelman were involved on the task force of this study. 

In 2020, Israel Policy Forum released a study titled: In Search Of A Viable Option, which evaluates seven potential outcomes for the Israeli-Palestinian conflict that assesses the strengths and weaknesses of different plans. The piece questions whether a two-state solution is still possible, and concludes it is still possible and is the only implementable plan that maintains Israel as Jewish and democratic. The study was written by Dr. Shira Efron and Evan Gottesman, and has a foreword written by Ambassador Daniel B. Shapiro, the U.S. Ambassador to Israel from 2011-2017. 

Israel Policy Forum orchestrated in April 2020 an open letter signed by nearly 140 US Jewish leaders, aimed at Kachol Lavan leader Benny Gantz and his deputy, MK Gabi Ashkenazi, urging them to “remain steadfast” in their opposition to West Bank annexation under a unity government. The missive warns against allowing the coronavirus pandemic to enable Israel to annex West Bank settlements, at a time when the country needs to unify in the face of a public health emergency.

Israel Policy Forum trains advocates to promote a peaceful resolution to the Israeli–Palestinian conflict through educational programs. Israel Policy Forum holds an annual Leadership Event to support key figures who promote peacemaking efforts. Previous speakers at the Leadership Event include President Bill Clinton, Vice President Al Gore, President Elect Joe Biden, Prime Minister Ehud Barak, then-Vice Prime Minister Ehud Olmert and Vice Prime Minister Haim Ramon.

See also
 Americans for Peace Now
 Commanders for Israel's Security
 J Street
 AIPAC

References

External links

Jewish-American political organizations
Jewish anti-occupation groups
Non-governmental organizations involved in the Israeli–Palestinian conflict
Zionism in the United States
Organizations based in New York City
1993 establishments in New York (state)